Banoka is a village located in Kurdistan Region's Erbil Province. It is located in the northeast of Erbil, near the town of Khalifan.

Gallery

References

Populated places in Erbil Governorate
Kurdish settlements in Iraq